The Missouri Western Griffons are the sports teams of Missouri Western State University located in St. Joseph, Missouri. They participate in the NCAA's Division II and in the Mid-America Intercollegiate Athletics Association (MIAA).

Sports sponsored

Football 

Football at Missouri is played at Spratt Stadium. The current head football coach is Matt Williamson, who has held the position since 2017. He replaced Jerry Partridge, who was head coach from 1997–2016. Partridge became Missouri Western's all-time wins leader on September 30, 2006 as the Griffons defeated Truman State University. His current total of 149 career victories ranks third on the MIAA all-time list.

Kansas City Chiefs summer training camp 

The school has been the summer training camp for the Kansas City Chiefs since 2010. The $15.7 million facility was paid for by $10 million from the Chiefs (from state tax credits) and $1.2 million from student fees at Missouri Western, with the rest coming from the City of St. Joseph, Buchanan County and private donations. It was designed by St. Joseph architect firm Ellison-Auxier architects, Inc., which designed the school's Spratt Hall and clock tower.

A climate-controlled, 120-yard NFL regulation grass indoor field, with a locker room, weight room, training room, classrooms and office space was completed in the summer of 2010. This facility is referred to as the "Griffon Indoor Sports Complex."

Notable alumni 
Roger Allen III, NFL offensive lineman
Chris Ball, Northern Arizona University head football coach
David Bass, NFL defensive lineman
Michael Hill, NFL running back
Travis Partridge, CFL quarterback
Paul Rhoads, college football coach
Gijon Robinson, NFL tight end
Larry Taylor, Olympic basketball player
Greg Zuerlein, NFL kicker
Michael Jordan, NFL defensive back
Leonard Wester, NFL offensive lineman
Sam Webb, NFL Defensive Back

References

External links